EISPACK is a software library for numerical computation of eigenvalues and eigenvectors of matrices, written in FORTRAN. It contains subroutines for calculating the eigenvalues of nine classes of matrices:  complex general, complex Hermitian, real general, real symmetric, real symmetric banded, real symmetric tridiagonal, special real tridiagonal, generalized real, and generalized real symmetric matrices.
In addition it includes subroutines to perform a singular value decomposition.

Originally written around 1972–1973, EISPACK, like LINPACK and MINPACK, originated from  Argonne National Laboratory, has always been free, and aims to be portable, robust and reliable. The library drew heavily on algorithms developed by James Wilkinson, which were originally implemented in ALGOL.  Brian Smith led a team at Argonne developing EISPACK, initially by translating these algorithms into FORTRAN. Jack Dongarra joined the team as an undergraduate intern at Argonne, and later went on to create LAPACK, which has largely superseded EISPACK and LINPACK.

Documentation

References

External links
Netlib download site for EISPACK
Interview with Jack Dongarra about EISPACK.

Fortran libraries
Numerical linear algebra
Numerical software